Barlamunda is a tribal village in Koraput district, Odisha, India. It has no electricity, running water or road access, despite being promised rudimentary facilities (beginning with a road) under the National Rural Employment Guarantee Scheme.

References

External links

Villages in Koraput district